Gemmell is an unincorporated community in Koochiching County, Minnesota, United States; located near Mizpah and Northome.

The community is located between Northome and Big Falls at the junction of County Roads 12 and 25; and U.S. Highway 71.

Gemmell is located within ZIP code 56660 based in Mizpah.

Clear Lake and Dark Lake are in the vicinity. Gemmell is located within the Pine Island State Forest.

Geography
Gemmell is located within Northome Unorganized Territory.  Nearby places include Mizpah, Northome, Kelliher, and Margie.

Gemmell is located 10 miles northeast of Northome; and 21 miles southwest of Big Falls.  Gemmell is 52 miles northeast of Bemidji; and 60 miles southwest of International Falls.

History
A post office called Gemmell was established in 1905, and remained in operation until 1974. The community was named for W. H. Gemmell, a railroad official.

References

 Rand McNally Road Atlas – 2007 edition – Minnesota entry
 Official State of Minnesota Highway Map – 2011/2012 edition
 Mn/DOT map of Koochiching County – Sheet 1 – 2011 edition

Unincorporated communities in Koochiching County, Minnesota
Unincorporated communities in Minnesota